Hemisphere Dancer is singer/songwriter Jimmy Buffett's personal seaplane. A Grumman HU-16 Albatross flying boat, former U.S. Navy Bureau Number (BuNo) 137928 and civil registration number N928J.  The aircraft is central to the action in Buffett's best-selling memoir A Pirate Looks at 50.

History

This aircraft began life on August 22, 1955, as a long range search and rescue platform for the U.S. Navy.  The largest member of the Grumman "waterfowl" series of amphibious airplanes, the Albatross remained in service with the U.S. Navy until the mid-1970s. After it remained inactive for a number of years, Buffett purchased the aircraft in the 1990s and restored it.

"Jamaica Mistaica"

This is the plane Buffett was flying during the incident recounted in the song "Jamaica Mistaica" on the album Banana Wind. While in Jamaica on January 16, 1996, Buffett's plane was shot at by Jamaican police. The Hemisphere Dancer was carrying Buffett, U2's lead singer Bono, his wife Ali, their children Jordan and Eve, and Island Records founder Chris Blackwell. Police suspected it was smuggling drugs. No one was hurt, although there were a few bullet holes in the plane.

A Pirate Looks at 50
After making a number of other trips around the Caribbean with it, Buffett set off on a tour of the Caribbean, Central, and South America, in celebration of his 50th birthday.  Accompanying him were his wife, son, youngest daughter, and some hired pilots to lighten the workload.  Despite numerous efforts at obtaining the requisite clearances and permissions, the Hemisphere Dancer was only allowed to make a water landing once during the month-long odyssey.  This action is chronicled in Buffett's autobiographical travelogue A Pirate Looks at 50, which was an immediate #1 best seller on the  

Current status

Since publication of A Pirate Looks at 50, the Hemisphere Dancer'' has become an icon of Parrothead culture, being featured on clothing, Jimmy Buffett's Margaritaville restaurant menus, and as the namesake of drinks and garnishes at Margaritaville and Cheeseburger in Paradise Restaurants. It has made numerous visits to general aviation fly-ins such as the Sun 'n Fun and EAA AirVenture Oshkosh exhibitions.

In 2003, Buffett retired the aircraft from active flying service. It is now featured as an outdoor bar and seating area at Buffett's Margaritaville at Universal Orlando Resort's CityWalk in Orlando, Florida.

References

Individual aircraft
Jimmy Buffett
Seaplanes
Universal Orlando